Gordon Brown is a Scottish–Australian antique dealer, and presenter of several television programs about antiques and collecting.

Born in Glasgow, Scotland, Brown began collecting and selling antiques in Edinburgh at the age of 19. He travelled to Australia, living in Perth and eventually settling in Hobart, Tasmania, where he now owns an antique shop.

With his friend Charles Wooley, Brown produced a television pilot for an antique series, which was commissioned for eight episodes by Peter Meakin at the Nine Network. However, before the series went into production, Meakin moved to the Seven Network. Brown instead presented a segment called "The Tartan Treasure Hunter" for A Current Affair.

In 2005, Brown was hired by the ABC to present a segment called "Roving Eye" on the new series Collectors, as well as acting on the show's panel as an expert on Georgian and Victorian antiques.

Collectors was cancelled in 2011, and Brown presented the second series of Auction Room, replacing William McInnes.

References

Year of birth missing (living people)
Living people
Australian television presenters
Scottish emigrants to Australia